Flag of the USSR may refer to:

 Flag of the Soviet Union
 Flags of the Soviet Republics
 List of Russian flags, includes historical Soviet flags